Rawa (Erawa, Erewa, Raua) is one of the Finisterre languages of Papua New Guinea. The two dialects, Rawa and Karo, are on opposite sides of the Finisterre Range.

References

External links 
 

Finisterre languages
Languages of Morobe Province